Into a Secret Land is the third studio album by German singer Sandra, released on 24 October 1988 by Virgin Records. The album was commercially successful and spawned the singles "Heaven Can Wait", "Secret Land", "We'll Be Together" and "Around My Heart".

Background and release
The album was recorded at Sandra and Michael Cretu's home studio in Ibiza, Spain, where the couple had recently relocated and married in January 1988. It was the only Sandra album with every song co-written by Hubert Kemmler, and her last to feature his trademark backing vocals, until Stay in Touch (2012).

Into a Secret Land reached the top 10 in Switzerland and Finland, and the top 20 in Germany, Austria and Norway. It has been certified platinum in both France and Switzerland, and remains one of Sandra's best-selling albums.

The album was supported by four singles: "Heaven Can Wait" and "Secret Land" in 1988, followed by "We'll Be Together" and "Around My Heart" in 1989. All four singles reached the top 10 or top 20 in numerous European charts. "La vista de luna" was released as a promotional single in Spain in 1989.

Track listing

Personnel
Credits adapted from the liner notes of Into a Secret Land.

 Sandra – lead vocals
 Michael Cretu – production, mixing
 Frank Peterson – mixing
 Hubert Kemmler – backing vocals (uncredited)
 Mike Schmidt – cover
 Pepe Botella – photography

Charts

Weekly charts

Year-end charts

Certifications

References

1988 albums
Albums produced by Michael Cretu
Sandra (singer) albums
Virgin Records albums